Gulik is a rural locality (a selo) in Sosnovoborsky Selsoviet of Zeysky District, Amur Oblast, Russia. The population was 297 as of 2018. There are 8 streets.

Geography 
Gulik is located on the right bank of the Gulik River, 13 km west of Zeya (the district's administrative centre) by road. Zeya is the nearest rural locality.

References 

Rural localities in Zeysky District